Open class is a track and field athletics event classification defined by IAAF and USA Track & Field.

Rules
The classification is defined as:

 Having no maximum age limit
 Men's long distance running is limited to male athletes sixteen (16) years and older on the day of the competition.
 Men's race walking and all women's competition, athletes shall be fourteen (14) years or older on the day of the competition

See also
 Under-18 athletics
 Under-20 athletics
 Under-23 athletics

References

External links
 2009 Competition Rules

Sport of athletics terminology
Age categories in athletics